Season 2000-01 saw Livingston compete in the Scottish First Division. They also competed in the Bell's Challenge Cup, League Cup and the Scottish Cup.

Summary
During Season 2000-01 Livingston won the Scottish First Division. They reached the final of the Bell's Challenge Cup losing to Airdrieonians, the third round of the Co-operative Insurance Cup and the semi final of the Scottish Cup.

Results & fixtures

First Division

Challenge Cup

League Cup

Scottish Cup

Statistics

League table

References

Livingston
Livingston F.C. seasons